Guffey Gorge, also known as Paradise Cove, Guffey Cove, Guffey Gulch (as the locals know it as) is a swimming hole and cliff diving spot on Four Mile Creek about ten miles east of Guffey, Colorado. From mid-May to mid-September, there is a $6 per vehicle day-use fee. Credit card payments are available through the recreation.gov app using Scan and Pay. The app must be installed  and an account  created before arrival due to the lack of cell service in the area. There are regulations in place: no alcohol, no overnight camping, no amplified music, no target shooting, no glass, pets must be on a leash, and parking in designated areas only. Visitors are only allowed to use the area between dawn and dusk. It is Located 2 hours southwest of Denver, near a small parking lot alongside CR 112.  The cove is a short, but sometimes steep 1/2 mile (one way) hike.  This scenic swimming hole can regularly see 300 people a day on weekends in the summer.  The top of the cove is marked with a sign warning of the danger of jumping. The trail down to the swimming hole is short and steep.

See also
Cliff jumping

References

Canyons and gorges of Colorado
Landforms of Park County, Colorado
Tourist attractions in Park County, Colorado